Declan Cusack (born 28 April 1988) is an Irish rugby union player, who is currently a player–coach at English North 1 East club York. He normally plays as a fly-half but has occasionally played as a centre.

Munster
He made his debut for Munster against Connacht on 18 April 2010, starting at fly-half. He was part of the Munster A team that lost to Cornish Pirates in the final of 2009–10 British and Irish Cup in May 2010.
On 27 April 2012, Cusack came off the bench for Munster A in their 31–12 2011–12 British and Irish Cup Final victory against Cross Keys. On 5 May 2012, Cusack came off the bench for Munster in the last league fixture of the 2011–12 season against Ulster and scored his first points for the province, a conversion of Munster's fourth try. It was announced on 3 May 2012 that Cusack would leave Munster at the end of the 2011–12 season.

Gernika RT
Cusack made six starts for Basque side Gernika RT in the 2012–13 European Challenge Cup, scoring 50 points.

Plymouth Albion
He recently signed a short-term contract with RFU Championship side Plymouth Albion until the end of the 2012–13 season. He also joined the Plymouth squad for the 2013–14 season.

Doncaster
Cusack joined another RFU Championship side, Doncaster R.F.C, at the beginning of the 2015–16 season. Whilst at Doncaster, Cusack played a single match on loan to Leicester Tigers during the 2017–18 Anglo-Welsh Cup. He moved on to become a player-coach at York RUFC at the end of the 2018–2019 season.

York
Having previously coached at Doncaster, Cusack joined York as a player-coach ahead of the 2019–20 season. York won North 1 East in the 2019–20 season.

References

External links
Munster Profile

Living people
1988 births
Rugby union players from County Limerick
Irish rugby union players
Munster Rugby players
Plymouth Albion R.F.C. players
Doncaster Knights players
Doncaster Knights coaches
Leicester Tigers players
Rugby union fly-halves
Rugby union centres